Hemolysis (from Greek αιμόλυση, meaning 'blood breakdown') is the breakdown of red blood cells. The ability of bacterial colonies to induce hemolysis when grown on blood agar is used to classify certain microorganisms. This is particularly useful in classifying streptococcal species. A substance that causes hemolysis is a hemolysin.

Types

Alpha-hemolysis
When alpha-hemolysis (α-hemolysis) is present, the agar under the colony is light and greenish. Streptococcus pneumoniae and a group of oral streptococci (Streptococcus viridans or viridans streptococci) display alpha hemolysis.  This is sometimes called green hemolysis because of the color change in the agar.  Other synonymous terms are incomplete hemolysis and partial hemolysis. Alpha hemolysis is caused by hydrogen peroxide produced by the bacterium, oxidizing hemoglobin producing the  green oxidized derivative methemoglobin.

Beta-hemolysis
Beta-hemolysis (β-hemolysis), sometimes called complete hemolysis, is a complete lysis of red cells in the media around and under the colonies: the area appears lightened (yellow) and transparent.   Streptolysin, an exotoxin, is the enzyme produced by the bacteria which causes the complete lysis of red blood cells.  There are two types of streptolysin: Streptolysin O (SLO) and streptolysin S (SLS).  Streptolysin O is an oxygen-sensitive cytotoxin, secreted by most Group A streptococcus (GAS) and Streptococcus dysgalactiae, and interacts with cholesterol in the membrane of eukaryotic cells (mainly red and white blood cells, macrophages, and platelets), and usually results in β-hemolysis under the surface of blood agar.  Streptolysin S is an oxygen-stable cytotoxin also produced by most GAS strains which results in clearing on the surface of blood agar.  SLS affects immune cells, including polymorphonuclear leukocytes and lymphocytes, and is thought to prevent the host immune system from clearing infection. Streptococcus pyogenes, or Group A beta-hemolytic Strep (GAS), displays beta hemolysis.

Some weakly beta-hemolytic species cause intense beta hemolysis when grown together with a strain of Staphylococcus. This is called the CAMP test. Streptococcus agalactiae displays this property. Clostridium perfringens can be identified presumptively with this test. Listeria monocytogenes is also positive on sheep's blood agar.

Gamma-hemolysis
If an organism does not induce hemolysis, the agar under and around the colony is unchanged, and the organism is called non-hemolytic or said to display gamma-hemolysis (γ-hemolysis). Enterococcus faecalis (formerly called "Group D Strep"), Staphylococcus saprophyticus, and Staphylococcus epidermidis display gamma hemolysis.

Hemedigestion
This is the nonspecific killing of blood cells by metabolic by-products of bacteria. This can be seen on a blood agar plate, when the blood surrounding the confluent part of your streak turns green, but there is no change around single colonies. Hemedigestion is seen with the cholera-causing bacteria, Vibrio cholerae.

Notes

References
 
Kato, Gregory J.; Steinberg, Martin H.; Gladwin, Mark T. (2017-03-01). "Intravascular hemolysis and the pathophysiology of sickle cell disease". Journal of Clinical Investigation. 127 (3): 750–760. doi:10.1172/JCI89741. ISSN 0021-9738.

Blood
Microbiology terms